Amos Kelly House is a historic home located at Cambridge Springs, Crawford County, Pennsylvania.  It was built between 1873 and 1876, and is large two-story rectangular frame dwelling in the Italianate style. It measures approximately 95 feet by 60 feet. The front facade features a large front porch, overhanging eaves, and a square cupola.

It was added to the National Register of Historic Places in 1980.

Gallery

References

Houses on the National Register of Historic Places in Pennsylvania
Italianate architecture in Pennsylvania
Houses completed in 1876
Houses in Crawford County, Pennsylvania
National Register of Historic Places in Crawford County, Pennsylvania